Coal Township is one of the fourteen townships of Perry County, Ohio, United States.  The 2000 census found 1,106 people in the township, 332 of whom lived in the unincorporated portions of the township.

Geography
Located in the southern part of the county, it borders the following townships:
Salt Lick Township - north
Monroe Township - east
Trimble Township, Athens County - southeast corner
Ward Township, Hocking County - south
Falls Township, Hocking County (northeastern portion) - west
Monday Creek Township - northwest

The village of New Straitsville is located in western Coal Township.

Name and history
Coal Township was established in 1872, and so named for the local coal-mining industry. Statewide, the only other Coal Township is located in Jackson County.

Government
The township is governed by a three-member board of trustees, who are elected in November of odd-numbered years to a four-year term beginning on the following January 1. Two are elected in the year after the presidential election and one is elected in the year before it. There is also an elected township fiscal officer, who serves a four-year term beginning on April 1 of the year after the election, which is held in November of the year before the presidential election. Vacancies in the fiscal officership or on the board of trustees are filled by the remaining trustees.

References

External links
County website

Townships in Perry County, Ohio
Townships in Ohio
1872 establishments in Ohio